Yann Frisch is a French magician. His signature magic trick is a cup and ball trick called "Baltass." A video of his sleight of hand Baltass performance was viewed 1.3 million times on YouTube in just over one week in 2012.  His work has been featured on Laughing Squid, Boing Boing, MSN, Gawker, and The Blaze. Frisch won the Grand Prix in close-up magic at FISM 2012. He was also named Champion du Monde at the 2012 Beijing International Magic Convention.

In 2020, he plays a character in a movie called "Les 2 Alfred", which was selected for the Cannes Film Festival.

References

External links
Another presentation of him

French magicians
Year of birth missing (living people)
Living people
Place of birth missing (living people)